Pelagodiscus is a monospecific genus of discinid brachiopods. Silica tablets leave a distinctive tesselating imprint on the inner surface of its shell.

References

Brachiopod genera
Monotypic protostome genera
Discinida